Sjaak is a given name and a nickname. Notable people with the name include:

 Jacobus Nicolaas Sjaak Brinkkemper (born 1958), Dutch computer scientist, and professor
 Jakob Frederik Sjaak Köhler (1902–1970), Dutch water polo player and swimmer
 Sjaak Lettinga (born 1982), Dutch footballer 
 Sjaak Lucassen (born 1961), Dutch long-distance motorcycle rider 
 Klaas Pieter Sjaak Pieters (born 1957), Dutch track cyclist
 Sjaak Polak (born 1976), Dutch footballer
 Sjaak Rijke, Dutch national held hostage by Al Qaeda in Mali 2011–2015
 Jesaia Sjaak Swart (born 1938), Dutch footballer 
 Jacob Sjaak Troost (born 1959), Dutch footballer 
 Sjaak (rapper) (born 1985), Dutch rapper

Dutch masculine given names
Lists of people by nickname